"Faces" is a song recorded by American DJ and music producer Candyland and Southern California based singer-songwriter Shoffy.

"Faces" was released as the follow-up to Candyland's prior single, "Speechless," on August 5, 2016.

Critical reception 

"Faces" achieved a handful of critical acclaim; and out of that, the song gained generally positive reviews.

In a review Neelu Mohaghegh wrote for Good Music All Day, Mohaghegh  complemented Shoffy's "seductive" vocals, as she compared them to that of the famous R&B singer, Miguel. Mohaghegh later on, cleped the song, "a revolutionary chant sprinkled with sexy undertones." Earmilk's Ry Smith also viewed the song positively, as he referred to the song as a "match made in house heaven," and subsequently praised the song's "massive amount of heart and soul".

Track listing

References 

2016 singles
Candyland (musician) songs
Monstercat singles
2016 songs